Sukinda is a town in Jajpur district, Odisha, India. Odisha accounts for about 98% of the total proved chromite (chromium ore) reserves of the country, of which about 97% occur in the Sukinda Valley. In September 2007, the Blacksmith Institute listed Sukinda as one of the 10 most polluted places in the world. Multiple local political figures and scientists disputed the listing, claiming that the Blacksmith Institute used outdated research.

Location
National Highway 200 passes through Sukinda. Sukinda is flanked by the Mahagiri range and the Daitari range, Sukinda Valley spreads over an area of 50 km2 from Kansa to Maruabil in Jajpur District. In the middle of this valley flows a natural stream, Damsala, and it joins river Brahmani at a point further from the valley.

Natural Resources
Sukinda has an abundance of chromite, around 97% of India's total deposits.

The valley is abundant in the deposits of chromite and has the largest open cast chromite ore mines in the world. Around 12 mines operate in the area without proper environmental controls, and pollution caused by the mines is a major health hazard.
60% of the drinking water contains hexavalent chromium at levels more than double international standards and as per an Indian health group estimations 84.75% of deaths in the mining areas — where regulations are non-existent — are due to chromite-related diseases. There has been virtually no attempt to clean up the contamination. The city is also in the list of most polluted cities in the world.

Tourist Places 
Near to sukinda there is lot of tourist places and those are well connected with road ways: Bramhani River bridge, Lord Jagannath Temple in Hatibari village, Chandaneswar Mahadev Temple in Kaitha village, Sun rise and sun set view point from Kaitha village, Maa Mangala Temple in Kaitha village, apart from that there are lot of mountains for tracking purpose (Mahagiri, Tamaka, Badasuli, Sunajhar).Beautiful Ashokajhara waterfall inside dense forest and a temple. Ragada Dam, nature's best view can found on foot hill of Nagada Hills.

References

External links
 Satellite map of Sukinda

Cities and towns in Jajpur district